Peter Schmidhuber (15 December 1931 – 26 December 2020) was a German and European politician from the Bavarian CSU party.

Biography

Schmidhuber was born in Munich, Bavaria. He studied law and economics at the Ludwig Maximilian University of Munich from 1951, gaining his license to practice as a lawyer in 1960. Schmidhuber worked from 1961 to 1966 in the Bavarian State Finance Department, then as a legal adviser from 1961 to 1978.

He joined the Christian Social Union in 1952. He was from 1960 to 1966 a member of the Munich City Council, and from 1965 to 1969 and again from 1972 to 1978 a member of the German Bundestag (the lower chamber of the national parliament). On 15 October 1978 he was elected to the Bavarian state parliament, and he remained there until 1987. From 1978 to 1987 he was in the private office of Franz-Josef Strauss while the latter was regional Minister for Federal and European questions. He was also a member, at different times, of the coordination committee between the two chambers of the federal German parliament, and of the NATO Parliamentary Assembly.

Between 1987 and 1995 Schmidhuber was a member of the three Delors Commissions in Brussels, where he replaced Alois Pfeiffer, also from Bavaria. Schmidhuber's portfolios in the European Commission included Economic Affairs and Employment (from 22 September 1987 to the end of 1989); the budget (1989 to 1992); and budget, financial control and the Cohesion Fund (from 1993 to 1994). After his retirement from the commission in 1995 Schmidhuber became a member of the Court of Directors of the Bundesbank (the German national bank). He worked subsequently for companies specializing in economic and company law.

Decorations

Schmidhuber was awarded the Bundesverdienstkreuz (the Federal Cross of Merit) in 1982, and promoted in the order in 1986 (Great Cross of Merit with Star) and 1990 (Great Cross of Merit with Star and Shoulder band). He has also received various other regional and trade-related honours.

Personal

Schmidhuber had one daughter (Susanne). His wife predeceased him. His interests were history and philosophy, chess and art.

References

Publications
A list of Schmidhuber's publications (in German) can be found on this weblink to the German national library http://dispatch.opac.d-nb.de/DB=4.1/REL?PPN=122929446

|-

|-

1931 births
2020 deaths
Christian Social Union in Bavaria politicians
Ministers of the Bavaria State Government
Grand Crosses with Star and Sash of the Order of Merit of the Federal Republic of Germany
Politicians from Munich
Ludwig Maximilian University of Munich alumni
European Commissioners 1985–1988
German European Commissioners